Nicolas Mahut, the defending champion, lost 2–6, 4–6 in the final to Steve Darcis.

Seeds

Draw

Finals

Top half

Bottom half

References
 Main Draw
 Qualifying Draw

Open de Rennes - Singles
2014 Singles